Winblad or Vinblad is the Swedish and Danish word for "wine leaf" or grape leaf.

People
Frideborg Winblad (1869–1964), Swedish educator
Ann Winblad (born 1950), American software executive
Anton Julius Winblad (1828-1901), music director for Ytterlännäs
Janice Ann Winblad (1935-1996), Nebraska Supreme Court case

In fiction
Ulla Winblad, fictional character

References

Swedish-language surnames